Nick Crowe is a 5-time Isle of Man TT Winner and 2008 British F2 Champion of sidecar racing. He started his career as a passenger before switching to driver in 2000, handing the passenger seat to his childhood friend Darren Hope.

In 2001 the TT races were cancelled due to Foot and Mouth, so Nick and Darren concentrated on different races in the UK and the Isle of Man. The next year was a good year for the pair. In 2004, with the purchase of Dave Molyneux's  outfit, the team could go faster in the Southern 100, at Jurby, and in the TT. 2005 brought Nick's first TT win in Race A, beating rival Dave Molyneux, who finished second in Race B.

In 2006, the A & J Groundworks outfit won the Double, both Race A and B. In 2007, with new passenger Daniel Sayle, Crowe set what was then the fastest-ever sidecar lap. However, the team were forced to retire from the lead in both races. With another new passenger, Mark Cox, Crowe won both Race 1 and 2 in 2008. In 2009, Crowe and Cox were on a Honda HM Plant/Dave Hudspeth Carpets F2 600cc.

Crowe and Cox qualified in pole for the 2009 event but suffered mechanical failure whilst leading race one.

In race two the pair crashed heavily at the 17 mile marker (Ballacob) on lap 1 and were taken to  Noble's Hospital by air with serious fractures. The crash was caused by a hare running onto the course in front of the duo. The race was cancelled, as was the following practice for the Senior TT. Nick was flown to the UK where he had a number of operations. Returning to the Island, he became involved in sidecar racing, running his own team with Simon Neary and Paul Napton sponsored by HMPLANT and Dave Hudspeth Carpets. 

For TT 2011, Crowe's team consisting of driver Simon Neary and passenger Jason Crowe pulled out after the 2nd practice.

Crowe who was a 5 time TT winner from 2005 to 2008 had a family member Jason Crowe competing in the TT and Southern 100 championship.

References

External links
 Team website

Isle of Man TT riders
Manx motorcycle racers
Year of birth missing (living people)
Living people
Sidecar racers